A car wash, carwash, or auto wash is a facility used to clean the exterior, and in some cases the interior of cars. Car washes can be self-service, full-service (with attendants who wash the vehicle), or fully automated (possibly connected to a filling station). 

Car washes may also be events where people pay to have their cars washed by volunteers, often using less specialized equipment, as a method to raise money for some purpose.

History

1946
The history of commercial car washes in the United States began in 1914. People used manpower to push or move the cars through stages of the process. The name is credited to Automobile Laundry in Detroit, Michigan, opened in 1914 by Frank McCormick and J.W. Hinkle .

Manual car wash operations peaked at 32 drive-through facilities in the United States. The first semi-automatic car wash in the United States made its debut in 1946. A facility in Detroit, Michigan, used automatic pulley systems and manual brushing.

1955
Dan Hanna, encouraged by car washers in Detroit, made his car wash in 1955 called the Rub-a-Dub in Oregon. In 1957, he formed Hanna Enterprises and eventually reached about 31 locations. In 1959, Hanna operated his wash rack until he made the first mechanized car washing system. Hanna saw expansion as the popularity of his mechanized system spread throughout the city.

1960s
By the mid-1960s, Hanna Enterprises established itself as the main manufacturer of car washing equipment and materials. This includes the Wrap-Around Brush, Roller-on-demand Conveyor belt, soft cloth friction washing, several ways to wash the tires, and a recirculating water system.

1970s
The 1970s introduced the automatic wheel cleaner and the polish'n'wax.

Categories

The following are forms of car washing.
Hand car wash facilities, where the vehicle is washed by employees.
Self-service facilities, generally coin-operated, where the customer manually washes the car with a wand dispersing water and low-pressure brushes, including pressurized "jet washing".
In-bay automatics involve the customer parking and an automatic wash machine rolls back and forth over the stationary vehicle. Housed at filling stations and stand-alone wash sites.
Conveyor or tunnel washes involve the car moving on a conveyor belt through a series of fixed cleaning mechanisms while the customer waits outside. Friction (brushes or curtains) or frictionless (high-pressure nozzles and touches wash) are used.
Mobile car washes, often also serving as mobile detailing systems, carry plastic water tanks and use pressure washers. Often systems are mounted on trailers, on trucks, or in vans. Generally, operators also have a generator to run a shop vac., buffers, and other tools.
Car wash lift, where cars are placed on a lift platform that can be used to wash under the car.
Touch-free (or touchless) car washing technology is the modern car wash system reducing consumption of water, chemical solutions and time. Washing machinery uses high-pressure jets that measure the length and width of the vehicle.

Use of chemicals 
Modern car wash facilities, whether tunnel, in-bay automatic, or self-serve, detergents, and other cleaning solutions used are designed to loosen and eliminate dirt and grime. This is in contrast to earlier times, when hydrofluoric acid, a hazardous chemical, was commonly used as a cleaning agent in the industry by some operators. There has been a move in the industry to shift to safer cleaning solutions. Most car wash facilities are required by law to treat and/or reuse their water and may be required to maintain wastewater discharge permits. This is in contrast to unregulated facilities or even driveway washing (at one's home), where wastewater can end up in the storm drain and, eventually, in streams, rivers, and lakes.

A chemical car wash, also known as a waterless car wash, uses chemicals to wash and polish car surfaces. This method is claimed to be eco-friendly. It is recommended only for cars with light dirt accumulation to avoid paint damage.

Mechanized car washes, especially those with brushes, may risk damaging the exterior finish. Paint finishes have improved as also car washing processes. More facilities utilize "brushless" (cloth) and "touch-free" (high-pressure water) equipment, as well as modern "foam" washing wheels made of closed-cell foam.

Self-serve car wash

A self-serve car wash is a simple and automated type of car wash that is typically coin-operated or token-operated self-service system. Newer self-service car washes offer the ability to pay with credit cards or loyalty cards. The vehicle is parked inside a large, covered bay that is equipped with a trigger gun and wand (a high-pressure sprayer) as well as a foam brush for scrubbing. When customers insert coins or tokens into the coin box, they can choose options such as soap, tire cleaner, wax or clear water rinse, all dispensed from the sprayer, or scrub the vehicle with the foam brush. The number of coins or tokens inserted determines the amount of time customers have to operate the equipment; in most instances, a minimum number of coins is necessary to start the equipment. These facilities are often equipped with separate vacuum stations that allow customers to clean the upholstery and rugs inside their cars. Some self-service car washes offer hand-held dryers.

Automatic car wash

Conveyorized/tunnel car wash

The first conveyorized automatic car wash appeared in Hollywood, California in 1940. Conveyorized automatic car washes consist of tunnel-like buildings into which customers (or attendants) drive.

Some car washes have their customers pay through a computerized POS, or point of sale unit, also known as an "automatic cashier", which may take the place of a human cashier. The mechanism inputs the wash PLU into a master computer or a tunnel controller automatically. When the sale is automated, after paying the car is put into a line-up called the stack or queue. The stack moves sequentially, so the wash knows what each car purchased. After pulling up to the tunnel entrance, an attendant usually guides the customer onto the conveyor. At some washes, the system will send the correct number of rollers automatically, based on tire sensors. The tire sensor lets the wash know where the wheels are and how far apart they are. On other systems the employee may guide the customer and press a 'Send Car' button on the tunnel controller, to manually send the rollers which push the car through.

Before entering the automated section of the wash tunnel, attendants may prewash customers' cars. 

The car wash will typically start cleaning with chemicals called presoaks applied through special arches. CTAs, or "chemical tire applicators," apply specialized formulations, which remove brake dust and build-up from the surface of the wheels and tires. 

In some car washes, the presoak application is followed by a space or idle zone. Wheel cleaning equipment, such as sill brushes or high-pressure wheel blasters, may be placed in the idle zone. A sill brush (also known as a wheel brush or tire brush) consists of an 8-foot-long brush assembly that is pushed against the car's wheels and door sill area. Brushes typically use flagged bristle, as dirt is usually most heavily concentrated on the lower parts of the car. The material on a sill brush may have alternating lengths or use a material that is intentionally mounted off-centre to allow wheel surfaces of various depths to be cleaned. Sill brushes rely on the rotation of a customer's car's wheels to achieve complete wheel contact. Similar to the CTAs, wheel brushes often only activate when the customer buys a wheel cleaning upgrade. Some car washes use wheel-rim disc brushes in addition to or in place of sill brushes. These assemblies extend out towards the wheel and follow it at the same speed as the conveyor while rotating at high speeds to clean the wheels. At the end of a car wash's presoak idle zone is often a high-pressure arch that directs water at a vehicle's surface. 

Mitters are ribbon-like components that suspend cloth strips or sheets over the tunnel while utilizing motion to increase friction against the car's surface. The friction zone may also include specialized front grill and rear brushes. Older automatic washes - a majority of which were built before 1980 - used to use brushes with soft nylon bristles, which tended to leave a nylon deposit in the shape of a bristle, called brush marks, on the vehicle's paint. Many newer facilities use either a soft cloth or a closed-cell foam brush, which does not hold dirt or water, and thus is less likely to harm the painted finish. 

After the main friction zone, some car washes have a dedicated care zone. Before entering the care zone, the car is rinsed with fresh water. This is immediately followed by a series of extra services. In many car washes, the first of these services is a polish wax. After the polish wax application is typically a retractable mitter or top brush and, in some cases, side brushes or wrap-around brushes. Next is a protectant, which creates a thin protective film over a vehicle's surface. Protectants generally repel water, which assists in drying the car and aiding in the driver's ability to see through their windshield during rain. A low-end wax or clear coat protectant follows the main protectant. A drying agent is typically applied at the end of the tunnel to assist in removing water from the vehicle's surface before forced air drying. After the drying agent, there may be a "spot-free" rinse of soft water, that has been filtered of the salts normally present and sent through semi-permeable membranes to produce highly purified water that will not leave spots.

Dryers may be present in a variety of forms, such as stationary gantries with a contouring roof jet or as small circular assemblies with nozzles of various shapes and sizes mounted on arches. Mitters, side brushes, top brushes, and/or wraps outfitted with chamois- or microfiber-based material may follow the dryers. 

At "full-service" car washes, the exterior of the car is washed mechanically, by hand, or using a combination of both, with attendants available to dry the car manually and clean the interior. Many full-service car washes also provide "detailing" services, which may include polishing and waxing the car's exterior by hand or machine, shampooing, and steaming interiors as well as other services to provide thorough cleaning and protection to the car.

Touchless wash

Like soft-touch car washes, touchless car washes are automated, with the vehicle passing through a tunnel where it is cleaned. However, touchless car washes do not use the foam or cloth applicators that soft-touch washes to use, instead relying on high-pressure washers to clean and rinse the vehicle. Sensors utilized by these washes allow for a more precise clean along with the vehicle's exact shape. To compensate for not physically contacting the vehicle, touchless washes use higher pressures and more caustic detergents than ordinary car washes. Because the vehicle is not physically touched during a touchless wash, the vehicle is at a lower risk of being damaged. However, touchless washes have a harder time cleaning off tougher materials or reaching difficult-to-reach locations on vehicles, and their usage of stronger chemicals can potentially damage a vehicle's paint finish.

Environmental factors
The primary environmental considerations for car washing are:
Use of water and energy resources;
Contamination of surface waters;
Contamination of soil and groundwater.

The use of water supplies and energy is self-evident since car washes are users of such resources. The professional car wash industry has made strides in reducing its environmental footprint, a trend that will continue to accelerate due to regulation and consumer demand. Many car washes use water reclamation systems to significantly reduce water usage and a variety of energy usage reduction technologies. These systems may be mandatory where water restrictions are in place.

Contamination of surface waters may arise from the rinse discharging to storm drains, which eventually drain to rivers and lakes. Chief pollutants in such wash-water include phosphates; oil and grease; and lead. This is almost exclusively an issue for home/driveway washing, and parking lot-style charity washes. Professional carwashing is a "non-point source" of discharge that can capture these contaminants, normally in interceptor drains, so the contaminants can be removed before the water enters sanitary systems. (Water and contaminants that enter storm-water drains do not undergo treatment, and are released directly into rivers, lakes, and streams.)

Soil contamination is sometimes related to such surface runoff and is associated with soil contamination from underground fuel tanks or auto servicing operations which commonly are ancillary uses of car wash sites — but not an issue for car washing.

For these reasons, countries like Switzerland and Germany have banned citizens from washing their cars at home. In the US, some state and local environmental groups (the most notable being the New Jersey Department of Environmental Protection) have begun campaigns to encourage consumers to use professional car washes as opposed to driveway washing, including moving charity car wash fundraisers from parking lots to professional car washes. Poland, Portugal, Italy and many other countries have no regulations in regard to wastewater from car washing.

See also
Auto detailing
Automobile repair shop
Car costs
Jetwash

References

External links

International Carwash Association
Canadian Car Wash Association

Wash
Wash
Service retailing